Binta Mansaray, COR, is a Sierra Leonean human rights advocate and activist, who was appointed Registrar of the Special Court for Sierra Leone (SCSL) by the United Nations Secretary-General in September 2014. She had served as Acting Registrar since June 2009 and was previously Deputy Registrar of the SCSL from July 2007. In 2012, she was one of the women whose "historic" leadership at the helm of the SCSL was highlighted, "with all of its four Principals being women—a first in the history of international tribunals." In 2022, she was the recipient of the National Reconciliation Award, which honours an individual who has made a consistent contribution to transitional justice or human rights in Sierra Leone.

Born in Sierra Leone, Mansaray is a graduate of the University of Sierra Leone and has a master's degree in French from Fordham University in New York, as well as a master's degree in Public Administration and Policy from the American University in Washington, DC.

Honours and recognition 
In 2014, Mansaray was appointed Commander of the Order of the Rokel (COR), in recognition of her distinguished service to the Special Court for Sierra Leone.

In July 2022, she was the recipient of the National Reconciliation Award is, an initiative of the Center for Memory and Reparations honouring "an outstanding Sierra Leonean who has made significant contributions, and stood firm in the struggle for transitional justice, human rights, and national reconciliation in Sierra Leone for a minimum of 10 years".

References

External links 
 UN Biography Binta Mansaray
 "Binta Mansaray (2018) on International Tribunals" (interview). YouTube video, 29 August 2018.

American University alumni
Fordham University alumni
Living people
Sierra Leonean activists
Sierra Leonean officials of the United Nations
Sierra Leonean women activists
Special Court for Sierra Leone
University of Sierra Leone alumni
Women human rights activists
Year of birth missing (living people)